Reiko M. Aylesworth (born December 9, 1972) is an American film, television and stage actress, best known for her role on the television series 24 as Michelle Dessler.

Early life, career start
Aylesworth was born December 9, 1972, in Evanston, Illinois, and is of Dutch, Welsh, and Japanese ancestry. Her given name Reiko (礼子) is Japanese; her surname Aylesworth is English. She lived in Springfield, Illinois, from 1987 to 1988, where she first became interested in acting. After understudying in several productions at the Springfield Theatre Centre, Aylesworth was cast in the role of Consuelo in West Side Story, while her family was preparing to move to Seattle, Washington. When her family left for Seattle, she remained in Springfield with family friends for the duration of the play's run.

After joining her family in Seattle, Aylesworth attended the University of Washington and studied neuroscience.  While there, Aylesworth participated in several local theatre productions including Invisible Friends at the Seattle Children's Theatre and the Intiman Theatre Company's production of Peter Pan where she played Wendy.

Aylesworth's performance in Peter Pan brought her to the attention of talent scouts at ABC, leading to the beginning of her television and film career as Rebecca Lewis on the soap opera One Life to Live. After her character was written out of One Life to Live, she appeared in the independent film Childhood's End and the final episode of the HBO series Lifestories: Families in Crisis. During this time Aylesworth also appeared in at least three Off Broadway productions.

Following a guest appearance on Law & Order and a supporting role in the miniseries A Will of Their Own, Aylesworth had minor appearances in the movies Random Hearts and You've Got Mail followed by a guest star role in the CBS series Now and Again. Soon after NBC cast Aylesworth as Becca Coltrane in the pilot for the series Sherman's March, however, it was not picked up and aired as a standalone television movie.

Aylesworth continued her work on television with guest appearances in The West Wing, Law & Order: Special Victims Unit, and Ed as well as being cast in a lead role in the supernatural hospital drama All Souls. When All Souls was cancelled after its sixth episode, Aylesworth joined the cast of the new series The American Embassy, which was quickly cancelled after its fourth episode.

Career

24

Following the cancellation of The American Embassy, Aylesworth auditioned for the part of Nina Myers on Fox Network's 24 but the role went to Sarah Clarke. When casting began for 24's second season, Aylesworth again auditioned, this time for the part of Kate Warner, but the role went to Sarah Wynter. However, the producers were impressed with her and asked her to join the cast for a ten episode recurring role as Michelle Dessler, a CTU agent. Despite being credited as a guest star for the entire season, she appeared in all 24 episodes.

Director Jon Cassar quickly noticed the "chemistry" between Aylesworth and her costar Carlos Bernard, in the role of Tony Almeida. which led to a decision to develop the characters' onscreen relationship. The relationship between Michelle and Tony quickly became popular with fans and later would resurface as one of the driving forces in 24'''s seventh season.

While on hiatus from 24 after season two, Aylesworth filmed an episode for the second season of The Dead Zone, playing a love interest for Anthony Michael Hall's Johnny Smith. By 24's third season (2003–2004), Aylesworth had become a main cast member with Tony and Michelle now married and holding leadership positions at CTU. However, when the season concluded, the writers announced that most of the characters were being dropped, with those actors not being retained for season 4. Upon being released from 24, Aylesworth was cast as Chandra Moore, a DNA analyst, in the fifth season of CSI: Crime Scene Investigation; while the role was intended to be recurring, it was dropped after the September 2004 season opener.

As season 4 of 24 progressed, some of the characters from previous seasons returned mid-season, including Aylesworth as Michelle Dessler. The character returns in the twelfth episode, now a high level bureaucrat within the CTU hierarchy, serving as CTU Director for the remainder of the season. Her character resigns at the end in order to remarry Tony Almeida, then is killed by a car bomb in the opening episode of season 5.

Initial post-24 roles
Following her departure from 24, Aylesworth has remained active in both television and movies as well as theatre. Her first leading role in a feature film was in the independent, romantic drama Crazy love where she worked alongside Bruno Campos and former 24 costar Paul Schulze. Crazylove tells the story of Letty Mayer, a school teacher who suffers a nervous breakdown and while institutionalized, meets Michael (Campos) and the two begin a dangerous and unpredictable romance. She partnered with her former 24 costar Xander Berkeley in the Sci Fi Channel made-for-television movie, Magma: Volcanic Disaster. In a guest start role on the short-lived series Conviction, she played a renowned attorney who killed her husband and then defended herself at the murder trial. When the cast was selected for the series 3 lbs, Aylesworth was chosen for the role of Dr. Adrienne Holland, but the pilot was rejected by CBS. The following season, CBS decided to buy the series for a late fall 2006 premiere, but the lead roles were recast, including Aylesworth's. It is unknown whether she declined the 3 lbs role or she was not offered it again.

Soon after the conclusion of 24's fifth season, Aylesworth and her 24 costar D. B. Woodside filmed the short, First which was also written, produced, and directed by Woodside. Aylesworth's character, Angelina Marveau, was "a fallen French nun" who was fighting to choose between her religious beliefs and first love, a nihilistic, American professor, who was portrayed by Woodside.

2006–2008
In 2006, Aylesworth filmed roles for two feature movie along with an independent production. In the Kevin Costner movie, Mr. Brooks, Aylesworth portrayed a divorce lawyer, Sheila, who was representing the husband of Demi Moore's character, Detective Tracy Atwood. Departing from her previous type of characters, Aylesworth played the femme fatale Audrey Levine in the Gideon Raff independent thriller The Killing Floor.

Aylesworth played one of the two lead roles in Aliens vs. Predator: Requiem (2007). Her character, Kelly O'Brien, an Army pilot and soldier returning home after being deployed overseas, arrives in Gunnison, Colorado the day before the Aliens and Predator invade the town.

In January 2007, Aylesworth had a guest role in two episodes of the ABC comedy, The Knights of Prosperity, where she played the head of Mick Jagger's security company, Simone Cashwell. The Knights attempt to seduce her character in order to obtain the necessary security codes to access Mick Jagger's apartment and later trick Simone in order to get her thumbprint which is also needed to open the door. Soon after she filmed a supporting role in Hannah Davis and David Conolly's The Understudy where she played Police Chief Kinsky. While it has appeared at numerous film festivals, a DVD release date for The Understudy has not been announced.

Aylesworth continued her work in independent productions, filming a small part for Steven Kampmann's independent movie, Buzzkill. It was given a limited release in January 2012. In April 2008, Aylesworth was cast in a recurring role on ER, playing hospital chaplain Julia Dupree. Originally, Dupree was to appear in 5 episodes with the purpose of attracting the lecherous attention of Dr. Gates (John Stamos). Her role was extended for two additional episodes, but concluded due to the suspension of filming resulting from the 2007-2008 WGA Strike. A month later Aylesworth filmed a supporting role in the Steve Morris independent comedy The Assistants, which tells the story of a group of Hollywood assistants who are scheming to have their script turned into a feature film. Aylesworth has often said independent productions like these and past films such as No Deposit, No Return, are her preferred types of film.

Ongoing television work
Aylesworth has continued with one-off guest roles on episodes of various television dramas. She has also appeared in recurring roles, including five episodes in season three of Damages, as Dr. Malia Waincroft on seven episodes over three seasons of CBS's Hawaii Five-0, and nine episodes as Allie Jones over two seasons of Scorpion in 2016 and 2017.

Theatre work
Aylesworth has appeared in off-Broadway productions. She performed in the 2006 production of Etan Frankel's The Fearless at the Summer Play Festival and The New Group (naked)'s 2007 production of Heather Lynn MacDonald's Expats''.

Personal life
, Aylesworth had resided in New York City since 1993. Aylesworth is married to Rob Clare, a scholar and expert on Shakespearean theatre.

Filmography

Theatre

References

External links

BBC Drama Faces - Reiko Aylesworth

1972 births
20th-century American actresses
21st-century American actresses
Actresses from Evanston, Illinois
American film actresses
American people of Dutch descent
American actresses of Japanese descent
American film actors of Asian descent
American people of Welsh descent
American stage actresses
American television actresses
Living people
Actresses from Seattle